Magnús Ver Magnússon (born 23 April 1963) is an Icelandic former powerlifter and strongman competitor. He is a four-time World's Strongest Man, having won in 1991, 1994, 1995, 1996 and is widely regarded as one of the greatest strongmen of all time.

Career

Powerlifting
Magnús began powerlifting in 1984. In 1985, he won a medal in the junior European and World Championships. He won the Senior European title in the 125 kg (276 lb) class in 1988 and 1990. His best lifts in competition include a 437.5 kg (964.5 lb) squat, 400 kg (882 lb) raw squat, 275 kg (605 lb) bench press with shirt and 250 kg raw bench press, 375 kg (827 lb) raw deadlift, and a raw total of 1015 kg (2238 lb). He once held the world record for a tire deadlift of 445 kg (981 lb).

Strongman
Magnús competed in his first strongman contest in 1985, finishing third in the Iceland's Strongest Man competition won by Jón Páll Sigmarsson. He decided to focus solely on strongman competition after he won the 1991 World's Strongest Man contest. His strongman victories include the 1989 Pure Strength contest in Scotland, the 1991 and 1993 International Power Challenge, the 1992 Scandinavian Strongest Man (Finland), the 1992 Nordic Strongest Man (Denmark), the 1994 Europe's Strongest Man, the 1995 World Muscle Power Championship, and the 1995 and 1997 Viking Challenge.

In addition to his four World's Strongest Man titles, Magnús was also runner-up in 1992 and 1993. He has also won the Iceland's strongest man competition many times and the West coast Viking (Vestfjarðavíkingurinn) of Iceland nine times. He is considered to be one of the first modern strongman competitors and is regarded by many to be one of the best strongmen of all time. He carried Jón Páll's formula of being athletic for the dynamic tests of strength and having tremendous static strength to outlift some of the best Powerlifters. He was able to easily out-deadlift the favoured O.D Wilson by 40 kg in 1991 and out-squatted the world record holder in the squat, Gerrit Badenhorst, in 1995. After Magnus squatted 437.5 kg, Badenhorst commented that he had previously underestimated Magnus' pure strength and that Magnus' squat was the greatest squat he had ever seen from someone of his bodyweight.

He competed in a one-off event at the Giants Live Strongman Championship 2019 held in Wembley against fellow strongman legend Bill Kazmaier in the Hercules Hold, with the weight being reduced by 20 kg on each side from what the professional athletes were working with. Despite having not competed in a strongman event since 2005, Magnusson stunned the capacity crowd with a time of 101.2 seconds (1m 41.2s), whilst Kazmaier could only manage just over 18 seconds.

Other
In 2008, Magnús made an appearance on Comedy Central's The Daily Show. He also appeared in a Coors Light commercial as the "World's Strongest Man" which aired in the U.S.

Magnús frequently judges international powerlifting and strongman competitions. He owns a powerlifting and strongman gym in Kópavogur called Jakaból (Nest of Giants).

Magnús is the founder of the Magnús Ver Magnússon Classic, the MVM Classic. A strongman competition held in Iceland that qualifies the winner for the Worlds Strongest Man. Magnus ver has 2 daughters and a grandson

Personal records 
Squat - 437.5 kg (964.5 lbs) (World's Strongest Man 1995) (not to competition depth)
Squat - 400 kg (882 lbs) [Single ply] at 1991 Icelandic powerlifting championships
Deadlift - 370.5 kg (817 lbs) [Single ply] at 1991 Icelandic powerlifting championships
Deadlift - 370 kg (816 lbs) at 1996 WSM Final
Tire Deadlift (off 15") - 455 kg (1003 lbs)
Bench press - 275 kg (606 lbs) [Single ply] at 2004 Icelandic powerlifting championships
Log press - 160 kg (353 lbs) at 1995 Strongest Man on Earth
Natural Stone press - 136 kg (300 lbs) (Former world record)

See also 
 List of strongmen

References

External links 
 Profile
 Magnús's Coors Light commercial

1963 births
Magnus Ver Magnusson
Living people
Magnus Ver Magnusson
Magnus Ver Magnusson
Magnus Ver Magnusson